Callopistria apicalis is a moth of the family Noctuidae first described by Francis Walker in 1855. It is found in the Indian subregion, Sri Lanka, Sundaland and the Philippines.

The male has strongly bipectinate (comb like on both sides) antennae. Forewings dark, dull brown with obscure markings. There is a row of irregular, black, sagittate (arrowhead-shaped) marks. The basal part of the forewing is darker. Reniform distally paler. Hindwings dull brown with pale brown or whitish basal area.

References

Moths of Asia
Moths described in 1913
Hadeninae